Bruno Lafranchi (born 19 July 1955 in Altdorf UR) is a Swiss former long-distance runner. He represented his country in the marathon at two consecutive Olympic Games, in 1984 and 1988, as well as two World Championships.

International competitions

Personal bests
Outdoor
1500 metres – 3:40.85 (Bern 1986)
3000 metres – 7:51.70 (Florence 1981)
5000 metres – 13:25.97 (Zürich 1986)
10,000 metres – 29:10.25 (Lausanne 1985)
Marathon – 2:11:12 (Fukuoka 1982)
3000 metres steeplechase – 8:26.3 (Prague 1978)
Indoor
3000 metres – 8:00.16 (Milan 1982)

References

All-Athletics profile
ARRS profile

1955 births
Living people
People from the canton of Uri
Swiss male steeplechase runners
Swiss male long-distance runners
Athletes (track and field) at the 1984 Summer Olympics
Athletes (track and field) at the 1988 Summer Olympics
Olympic athletes of Switzerland
World Athletics Championships athletes for Switzerland